Associazione Sportiva Roma won the Coppa Italia and reached the final of the UEFA Cup, which compensated for Ottavio Bianchi's problematic league season, where Roma finished a mere 9th place, their worst season since 1979.

In the UEFA Cup, Roma reached the two-legged final, where Inter won at home by 2–0, a result which a Ruggiero Rizzitelli goal in the return leg could not cancel out. Instead, a 3–1 win at home and a draw at the Stadio Luigi Ferraris against Sampdoria secured the 1990–91 Coppa Italia, the club's seventh Coppa Italia.

Players

Goalkeepers
  Giovanni Cervone
  Angelo Peruzzi
  Giuseppe Zinetti

Defenders
  Amedeo Carboni
  Aldair
  Antonio Comi
  Manuel Gerolin
  Thomas Berthold
  Sebastiano Nela
  Stefano Pellegrini
  Dario Rossi
  Antonio Tempestilli

Midfielders
  Bruno Conti
  Fabrizio Di Mauro
  Giampiero Maini
  Giuseppe Giannini
  Stefano Desideri
  Fausto Salsano
  Giovanni Piacentini
  Daniele Berretta

Forwards
  Ruggiero Rizzitelli
  Rudi Völler
  Andrea Carnevale
  Roberto Muzzi

Competitions

Overall

Last updated: 9 June 1991

Serie A

League table

Results summary

Results by round

Matches

Coppa Italia

Second round

Round of 16

Quarter-finals

Semi-finals

Final

UEFA Cup

First round

Second round

Third round

Quarter-finals

Semi-finals

Final

Statistics

Goalscorers
  Rudi Völler 11 (4)
  Ruggiero Rizzitelli 5
  Andrea Carnevale 4 (1)
  Fausto Salsano 4
  Giuseppe Giannini 3
  Stefano Desideri 3
  Roberto Muzzi 3

References

A.S. Roma seasons
Roma